Pathariya Assembly constituency (formerly Patharia) is one of the 230 Vidhan Sabha (Legislative Assembly) constituencies of Madhya Pradesh state in central India. This constituency came into existence in 1961, following delimitation of the legislative assembly constituencies. It was reserved for the candidates belonging to the Scheduled castes from 1961 to 2008.

Overview
Pathariya (constituency number 54) is one of the 4 Vidhan Sabha constituencies located in Damoh district. This constituency covers the entire Batiyagarh and Pathariya tehsils of the district.

Pathariya is part of Damoh Lok Sabha constituency along with seven other Vidhan Sabha segments, namely, Damoh, Jabera and Hatta in this district, Deori, Rehli and Banda in Sagar district and Malhara in Chhatarpur district.

Members of Legislative Assembly
 1962: Rameshwar, Independent
 1967: K. Bhaosingh, Indian National Congress
 1972: Gopal Das Munnilal, Indian National Congress
 1977: Jiwan Lal Kanchhadilal, Janata Party
 1980: Gopal Das Munnilal, Indian National Congress (I)
 1985: Shyamlal, Indian National Congress
 1990: Mani Shankar Suman, Bharatiya Janata Party
 1993: Kaluram, Indian National Congress
 1998: Ganeshram Khatik, Bharatiya Janata Party
 2003: Sonabai Ahirwar, Bharatiya Janata Party
 2008: Ramkrishna Kusmaria, Bharatiya Janata Party
 2013 : Lakhan Patel :  Bharatiya Janata Party 
2018: Rambai Govind Singh : Bahujan Samaj Party

See also
 Patharia
2019: Rambai Singh Parihar : BSP

References

Damoh district
Assembly constituencies of Madhya Pradesh